is the publishing arm of Kadokawa Corporation, publishing manga, novels, light novels, magazines, tabletop role-playing games and other type of content with eight different publishing brand companies that previously merged with it. Kadokawa Dwango announced a restructuring in February 2019. On July 1, 2019, Kadokawa Corporation was reorganized; the publishing business remained and the company was renamed to Kadokawa Future Publishing. Kadokawa Dwango itself became the second iteration of Kadokawa Corporation.

History 
The company was founded on April 2, 1954, as Kadokawa Shoten. It was renamed Kadokawa Holdings on April 1, 2003, transferring the existing publishing businesses to Kadokawa Shoten Publishing. The company was again renamed Kadokawa Group Holdings on July 1, 2006. The company inherited the management and integration businesses within Kadokawa Shoten Publishing in January 2007. The magazine businesses were transferred to the Kadokawa Magazine Group. The company was renamed Kadokawa Corporation on June 22, 2013. 

On October 1, 2013, nine companies in the Kadokawa Group (ASCII Media Works, Chukei Publishing, Enterbrain, Fujimi Shobo, Kadokawa Gakugei Publishing, Kadokawa Production, Kadokawa Magazines, Kadokawa Shoten and Media Factory) were merged into Kadokawa Corporation. Eight of them operate now as brand companies. Kadokawa Production was dissolved and integrated into the General IP Business Headquarters. On December 30, 2013, Kadokawa had announced that the company has acquired 100% of publisher Choubunsha.

On May 14, 2014, it was announced that Kadokawa Corporation and Dwango, the owner of Niconico, would merge on October 1, 2014, and form the new holding company Kadokawa Dwango. Both Kadokawa and Dwango became subsidiaries of the new company. In February 2019, Kadokawa Dwango announced that Dwango would now be a direct subsidiary of Kadokawa Corporation in a reorganization of the company.

On July 1, 2019, Kadokawa Corporation was reorganized; the publishing business remained and the company was renamed to Kadokawa Future Publishing. Kadokawa Dwango itself became the second iteration of Kadokawa Corporation.

Brand companies (divisions) 
 ASCII Media Works
 Chukei Publishing 
 Enterbrain
 Fujimi Shobo
 Kadokawa Gakugei Publishing
 Kadokawa Magazines
 Kadokawa Shoten
 Media Factory

Subsidiaries 
 Building Book Center
 Kadokawa Key-Process

References

External links 
  

 
Book publishing companies of Japan
Magazine publishing companies of Japan